The 1996 Exxon World Sports Car Championship and Supreme GT Series seasons were the 26th season of the IMSA GT Championship.  It consisted of open-cockpit prototypes referred to as World Sports Car (WSC) and Grand Tourer-style racing cars divided into GTS-1 and GTS-2 classes.  It began February 3, 1996, and ended October 6, 1996, after ten rounds.

Schedule
Most races on the schedule had WSC and GTS-1 classes running together, while the GTS-2 class ran separate races, sometimes with different lengths.  Races marked with All had all classes on track at the same time for the whole race.

Season results

External links
 World Sports Racing Prototypes - 1996 IMSA GT Championship standings

IMSA GT Championship seasons
IMSA GT